The name Ambo has been used for five tropical cyclones in the Philippines by PAGASA in the Western Pacific Ocean.
 Tropical Depression Ambo (2004) (01W, Ambo) – a tropical depression that was only recognized by PAGASA and JTWC.
 Typhoon Neoguri (2008) (T0801, 02W, Ambo)
 Typhoon Mawar (2012) (T1203, 04W, Ambo)
 Tropical Depression Ambo (2016) (Ambo) – a tropical depression that was only recognized by PAGASA.
 Typhoon Vongfong (2020) (T2001, 01W, Ambo) – a disastrous Category 3 storm that hit the Philippines, causing over  damage.

The name Ambo was retired from the PAGASA naming lists after the 2020 season. It will be replaced by Aghon in the 2024 season.

Pacific typhoon set index articles